Hans Wagner (22 January 1923 – 16 September 2010) was an Austrian ice hockey player. He competed in the men's tournament at the 1956 Winter Olympics.

References

1923 births
2010 deaths
Austrian ice hockey players
Olympic ice hockey players of Austria
Ice hockey players at the 1956 Winter Olympics
Sportspeople from Klagenfurt
20th-century Austrian people